Jeff "Blando" Bland (born December 6, 1964 in Flint, Michigan) is an American guitarist who played for Michigan-based cover band, KODY LEE, Left For Dead and Saigon Kick. He is currently the lead guitarist for Slaughter and Vince Neil.

He has played with Mötley Crüe singer Vince Neil, both with his former Saigon Kick touring bandmate Phil Varone, and with his Slaughter bandmate Dana Strum.

Biography
Jeff Bland (BLANDO) was born in Flint, Michigan He joined Slaughter in 1998 as Tim Kelly's replacement after touring as their front-of-house sound technician.

Jeff also had a cover project CRASH that played bike rallies for RJ Reynolds (CAMEL CO.) in Daytona Beach for the past 12 years. The band consists of Blando (lead vocals/guitar), Will Hunt (drums) and Paul Drennan (bass). Blando is currently touring with Vince Neil as guitarist and musical director as well as working with Slaughter.
Jeff finished recording & engineering the Vince Neil release Tattoos & Tequila due to release May 5, 2010.
Also Blando has a three piece group called BLANDINI featuring Blando on Guitars & Lead Vocals, Zoltan Chaney on Drums & Pedro Sison on Bass.

He is also a motorcycle enthusiast, and owns one motorcycle having been built and customized by Count's Kustoms of Las Vegas.

Discography

With Left For Dead
 Beatings From Orlando (1995)

With Slaughter
 Back to Reality (1999)

With Crash
 Live From Daytona (2001)

With Vince Neil
 Tattoos & Tequila (2010)

References

1964 births
Living people
American heavy metal guitarists
Glam metal musicians
Slaughter (band) members
Vinnie Vincent Invasion members
Musicians from Flint, Michigan
Saigon Kick members
Guitarists from Michigan
American male guitarists
20th-century American guitarists